Didier Delgado Delgado (born 25 July 1992) is a Colombian professional footballer who plays as a right-back.

References

1992 births
Living people
Colombian footballers
Super League Greece players
Ionikos F.C. players
Association football defenders